Leszek Olszewski (born 18 March 1969) is a Polish boxer. He competed in the men's flyweight event at the 1992 Summer Olympics.

References

1969 births
Living people
Polish male boxers
Olympic boxers of Poland
Boxers at the 1992 Summer Olympics
People from Racibórz
Flyweight boxers